The men's freestyle lightweight competition at the 1932 Summer Olympics in Los Angeles took place from 1 August to 3 August at the Grand Olympic Auditorium. Nations were limited to one competitor. This weight class was limited to wrestlers weighing up to 66kg.

This freestyle wrestling competition did not use the single-elimination bracket format previously used for Olympic freestyle wrestling but instead followed the format that was introduced at the 1928 Summer Olympics for Greco-Roman wrestling, using an elimination system based on the accumulation of points. Each round featured all wrestlers pairing off and wrestling one bout (with one wrestler having a bye if there were an odd number). The loser received 3 points. The winner received 1 point if the win was by decision and 0 points if the win was by fall. At the end of each round, any wrestler with at least 5 points was eliminated.

Schedule

Results

Round 1

Kárpáti was the only winner by fall and therefore the only wrestler to advance with 0 points. The other three winners each received 1 point for wins by decision. The four losers each received 3 points.

 Bouts

 Points

Round 2

Klarén against Clodfelter was a bout between two first-round winners, each of whom were safe from elimination. Klarén won by fall to stay at 1 point; Clodfelter's loss took him to 4 points. Both bouts pitting a 1–0 wrestler against an 0–1 wrestler ended in the first-round winner winning again (Pacôme staying at 1 point with a win by fall, Kárpáti picking up his first point via win by decision) and the first-round loser eliminated. The bout between two first-round losers resulted in Thomas being the man eliminated and Pihlajamäki holding on at 4 points.

 Bouts

 Points

Round 3

Pacôme had a bye this round, staying at 1 point. The two contested bouts each featured a 1-point wrestler against a 4-point wrestler; in both cases, the 4-point wrestler won. Clodfelter initially won by fall, which would have resulted in his staying in the competition, but the officials declared a rematch. This time, Clodfelter won by decision. Pihlajamäki also won by decision. Both winners, therefore, picked up their fifth point and were the only wrestlers eliminated in the round despite each winning.

 Bouts

 Points

Round 4

Pacôme defeated Klarén to eliminate the latter, who received the bronze medal. Pacôme and Kárpáti (who had a bye) advanced to the final.

 Bouts

 Points

Final round

Pacôme defeated Kárpáti in the final to take the gold medal.

 Bouts

 Points

References

Wrestling at the 1932 Summer Olympics